Will Lovell (born 10 May 1993) is a rugby league footballer who plays as a  or  forward for the London Broncos in the Betfred Championship.

He played for the Broncos in the Super League between 2012 and 2014, and has spent time on loan from them at the London Skolars in the League 1. He has also spent the 2015 and 2016 seasons at the Skolars.

Background
Lovell was born in Northampton, Northamptonshire, England.

Career

Early career
Lovell played rugby union as a youth and was in the junior system of the Northampton Saints. He also played rugby league as an amateur for the Northampton Demons and from there progressed through to the London Broncos Academy system in 2010 and 2011.

London Broncos
Lovell made his Super League debut for the London Broncos away against the Catalans Dragons in May 2012.

He played one game on loan at the London Skolars in the League 1 in 2013.

He spent time on loan from the Broncos at the Skolars in the League 1 in 2014.

London Skolars
Lovell joined the London Skolars ahead of the 2015 Championship 1 season. He spent two seasons at White Hart Lane Community Sports Centre, featuring prominently in both 2015 and 2016.

Return to the Broncos
After a successful spell in North London, Lovell stepped up a division and signed a three-month deal with his former club ahead of the 2017 season. He was injured and took on a community role in lieu of his playing contract being extended.

He returned to the club as a player ahead of the 2018 season, playing mainly as a  forward.

Club statistics

References

External links

London Broncos profile
SL profile
Will Lovell: New London Broncos captain's 'crazy' career route
Lovell returns to London

1993 births
Living people
English rugby league players
London Broncos captains
London Broncos players
London Skolars players
Rugby league fullbacks
Rugby league players from Northampton
Rugby league wingers